Operation Hardtack II was a series of 37 nuclear tests conducted by the United States in 1958 at the Nevada Test Site. These tests followed the Operation Argus series and preceded the Operation Nougat series.

With test moratoriums on the horizon, American weapons labs rushed out many new designs. A hard deadline for testing was set at midnight (0000 hrs), October 31, 1958, as negotiations were set to start that day, and the schedule shows it, with 29 tests executed in October, four of them on the last day.  One other test was cancelled because weather delays postponed it across the midnight deadline.  After the conclusion of Hardtack II, the United States announced a unilateral testing moratorium, which the Soviet Union joined after two last tests on November 1 and 3.  In September 1961, the Soviet Union resumed nuclear testing—this period included the test of the most powerful nuclear device ever designed, the Tsar Bomba on October 30, 1961—and the United States followed suit with Operation Nougat.

Test Blasts

References

External links

 
 
 
 

Explosions in 1958
Hardtack II
1958 in military history
1958 in Nevada
1958 in the environment